The Girl from Backafall (Swedish: Flickan från Backafall) is a 1953 Swedish drama film directed by Bror Bügler and starring Viola Sundberg, Sven Lindberg and Kenne Fant. It is based on a poem by Gabriel Jönsson, which had been turned into a popular song in the 1920s, about the romance between a sailor and a woman on the island of Ven in the Baltic Sea.

The film's sets were designed by the art director Arne Åkermark.

Cast
 Viola Sundberg as Ellen  
 Sven Lindberg as Per  
 Kenne Fant as Nils  
 Edvard Persson as Silla-Sven  
 Holger Löwenadler as August Larsson 
 Märta Dorff as Mrs. Larsson  
 Erik 'Bullen' Berglund as Captain Backe 
 Dagmar Ebbesen as Mrs. Backe  
 Olof Winnerstrand as Vicar  
 Aurore Palmgren as Botilla  
 Olav Riégo as Dücker  
 Renée Björling as Mrs. Dücker  
 Charles Gregmar as Robert Dücker  
 Jan Molander as Hellberg  
 Verner Edberg as Adolf  
 Gösta Gustafson as Matts Shoemaker  
 Lars Egge as Fredrik Åkerberg
 Anders Andelius as Sailor at 'Tre bröder'  
 Margit Andelius as Mrs. Svensson  
 Per Appelberg as Boy at shooting range 
 Astrid Bodin as Dücker's cook  
 Helga Brofeldt as Gossip  
 Thure Carlman as Fisherman  
 Harald Emanuelsson as Lasse, postman  
 Kurt Friborn as Guest at Robert's party  
 Leif Hedenberg as Boy at the dance 
 John Larsson as Dücker's driver  
 Monica Lindman
 Sven Magnusson as Fisherman  
 Gull Natorp as Vicar's wife 
 Carin Norberg as Vera, Ellen's friend  
 Mim Persson as Guest at the coffee party  
 Bellan Roos as Dücker's housewife  
 Håkan Rylander as Woker  
 Bengt Sundmark as Boy at the dance  
 Gaby Svallner as Guest at Robert's party  
 Carin Swensson as Farmer's wife 
 Olle Teimert as Boy at shooting range  
 Rudolf Wendbladh as Schultze, German captain  
 Annalisa Wenström as Waitress  
 Berit Örtengren as Girl at shooting range

References

Bibliography 
 Qvist, Per Olov & von Bagh, Peter. Guide to the Cinema of Sweden and Finland. Greenwood Publishing Group, 2000.

External links 
 

1953 films
1953 drama films
Swedish drama films
1950s Swedish-language films
Films directed by Bror Bügler
Films set in the 1920s
Swedish black-and-white films
1950s Swedish films